Dunguaire Castle is a 16th-century tower house on the southeastern shore of Galway Bay in County Galway, Ireland, near Kinvara (also spelled Kinvarra). The name derives from the Dun (fort) of King Guaire, the legendary king of Connacht.

The castle's  tower and its defensive wall have been restored, and the grounds are open to tourists during the summer. Visitor can also (pre-)book a banquet, with a four course meal and entertainment; this service is offered from April to October.

History
The 19th century Gaelic scholar John O'Donovan states in his Ordnance Survey letters for County Galway, and his book, The Genealogies, Tribes and Customs of the Hy-Fiachrach, that Dunguaire was built by the Ó hEidhin (Hynes) clan, chiefs of Coill Ua bhFiachrach, the district around Kinvara, and also of Uí Fiachrach Aidhne an area coextensive with the diocese of Kilmacduagh covering the part of County Galway between the Burren and Galway Bay to the west and Slieve Aughty to the east.

Dunguaire Castle was used in the 1969 Walt Disney movie Guns in the Heather in which the castle was featured as Boyne Castle. It was also the Scottish castle home of the main character in the 1979 film North Sea Hijack.

Legends

Another regionally well known legend is the "Road of the Dishes" (Bothar na Mias), involving King Guaire and St. Colman of Kilmacduagh.

References

Castles in County Galway
Historic house museums in the Republic of Ireland
Museums in County Galway
Former populated places in Ireland
Tower houses in the Republic of Ireland